Martin Schneider (born 24 November 1968 in Schweinfurt) is a German former footballer who played as a midfielder.

Honours
Borussia Mönchengladbach
 DFB-Pokal winner: 1995; runner-up 1992.

References

1968 births
Living people
German footballers
Germany under-21 international footballers
Germany youth international footballers
FC Bayern Munich II players
1. FC Nürnberg players
Borussia Mönchengladbach players
MSV Duisburg players
1. FC Schweinfurt 05 players
Bundesliga players
2. Bundesliga players
Footballers from Bavaria
Association football midfielders
People from Schweinfurt
Sportspeople from Lower Franconia
West German footballers